Lepidoleucon is genus of calcareous sponges in the order Baerida. It is the only genus in the monotypic family Lepidoleuconidae, and consists of a single species, Lepidoleucon inflatum.

References

Calcaronea
Sponge families
Taxa named by Jean Vacelet